Escola sem Partido (Portuguese for Nonpartisan School) is a political movement in Brazil aimed at curbing what its supporters perceive to be ideological indoctrination in schools and universities.

The movement began in 2004, when attorney Miguel Nagib created a website where parents could post complaints of teachers and professors who were supposedly indoctrinating their children politically. Since then, there have been several proposals and bills introduced nationwide inspired by the "Escola sem Partido" concept, one of which was approved in the state of Alagoas in 2016. A federal bill, Bill no. 193, was introduced in 2016 by Senator Magno Malta.

The movement has gained steam in 2018, with the election of Jair Bolsonaro as president. Bolsonaro is a supporter of "Escola sem Partido", as was his former Minister of Education, Ricardo Vélez Rodríguez.

Opponents of "Escola sem Partido" say that the movement's proposals would restrict freedom of speech in the classroom and would harm critical thinking. Federal deputy Erika Kokay suggested that a "Escola sem Partido" bill would turn teachers into "enemies of the nation". In November 2018 the Global Campaign for Education released a motion criticizing "Escola sem Partido".

References

External links

Social movements in Brazil
Education in Brazil